Hrnjica brothers are heroes of epic poetry in Bosnia. The names of the brothers are Mujo, Halil and Omer. The epic poetry also mentions their beautiful sister Ajkuna. Mujo is hypocorism of Mustafa. Mustafa Hrnjica is historical person who was recorded as hajduk in the region of Ottoman held Velika Kladuša in 1641, together with his brothers.

The Hrnjica brothers descend from village Udbina in Lika. Their father came from Asia to Udbina and married a daughter of the local nobleman, Hurem-aga Kozlić.

There are several toponyms in the region of Velika Kladuša named after Hrnjica brothers, i.e. Well of Hrnjica or the Tower of Hrnjica.

According to the legends, Mujo was killed by his blood brother Katarica Meho, Halil was killed during some rebellion in Banja Luka while Omer was ambushed and killed by some hajduk harambaša.

The grave of Mujo Hrnjica is in Petrova Gora.

List of songs 

The songs about Hrnjica brothers include:
 Hrnjica Mujo u Janiku zarobljen
 Halil traži Mujova đogata
 Hrnjice u Skradinu
 Ženidba Hrnjice Halila
 Omer Hrnjica rescues Fatima, Mujo and Halil
 The Firman of Execution on Mujo Hrnjica
 The Death of Halil
 Mujo Hrnjica Defends Udbina
 Halil Hrnjica and Ćirko of Džlijit
 Halil rescues Ramo of Glamoč and Other Man from Glamoč from Captivity in Primorje
 Goljo the Border-Man, Mujo and Halil get their horses in Korman
 Omer Rescues Mujo, Halil and Osman from Captivity in Lenđer
 Mujo Finds His Horse
 Ajkuna Rescues the Brothers Hrnjica from Captivity in Ćorfez
 Hrnjica Mujo Avenges the Death of Mustajbey of the Lika

References 

Bosnia and Herzegovina culture
Characters in Serbian epic poetry